Sangarébougou  is a suburb of Bamako, the capital of Mali, and a commune in the Cercle of Kati in the Koulikoro Region of south-western Mali. The commune lies to the northeast of Commune I of Bamako and around 10 km from the city center. The commune covers and area of 20 square kilometers and in the 2009 census had a population of 45,518.

References

External links
.

Communes of Koulikoro Region